"Israelism" is a song recorded by Swedish group Army of Lovers and released in March 1993 as the first single from their third album, The Gods of Earth and Heaven (1993). The song was a top 10 hit in Belgium, Finland, Israel and Sweden. It combines the Jewish folk song "Hevenu Shalom Aleichem" with Eurodance-beats and also includes additional lyrics written by Alexander Bard, Anders Wollbeck, Jean-Pierre Barda, Michaela de la Cour and Dominika Peczynski.

When released, "Israelism" was presented like this,

Critical reception
In their review of The Gods of Earth and Heaven, Swedish newspaper Göteborgsposten viewed the song as a "controversial tribute to Jewish culture", stating that it is "yet another hit." Tony Cross from Smash Hits gave "Israelism" three out of five, calling it a "goose-stepping number". He added that "they've gone back to the formula of amateur dramatics, big chants, quirky keyboards and barmy blokes."

Chart performance
"Israelism" was a sizeable hit in several European countries and remains one of the band's biggest hits to date. In their native Sweden, the song charted for 4 weeks, peaking at number ten. It was also a top 10 hit in Belgium and Finland, peaking at number nine and five, and a top 20 hit in Denmark and Norway. In Germany and Switzerland, it was a top 40 hit. On the Eurochart Hot 100, the single peaked at number 48 in May 1993. It didn't chart on the UK Singles Chart in the UK. Outside Europe, "Israelism" was a top 10 hit in Israel.

Music video
The accompanying music video for "Israelism" was directed by Swedish director Fredrik Boklund. He also directed the other music videos for Army of Lovers.

Single track listing
 7" single
"Israelism" – 3:20
"Israelism" (Dub Version) – 3:13

 12" maxi-single
"Israelism" (Radio Edit) – 3:20
"Israelism" (Goldcalfhorahhorror Mix) – 6:54
"Israelism" (Kibbutznikblitzkrieg Mix) – 6:32
"Israelism" (Très Camp David Mix) – 3:13

 CD single
"Israelism" (Radio Edit) – 3:20
"Israelism" (Dub Version) – 3:13

Charts

Weekly charts

Year-end charts

References

1993 singles
1993 songs
Army of Lovers songs
English-language Swedish songs
Music videos directed by Fredrik Boklund
Polydor Records singles
Songs about Israel
Songs written by Alexander Bard
Stockholm Records singles